National Company Building is a historic department store building located at Rochester in Monroe County, New York. It was designed by J. Foster Warner in 1924 and is a five-story structure in the Classical Revival style.  The Beaux-Arts decorated building is characterized by precise carved detailing.

It was listed on the National Register of Historic Places in 1984.

References

Commercial buildings in Rochester, New York
Commercial buildings on the National Register of Historic Places in New York (state)
Neoclassical architecture in New York (state)
Commercial buildings completed in 1924
Department stores on the National Register of Historic Places
National Register of Historic Places in Rochester, New York